Play is an album by the American rapper Doug E. Fresh, released in 1995. It contains production from Doug E. Fresh, Frankie Cutlass, and Todd Terry. The album peaked at No. 81 on the Billboard Top R&B/Hip-Hop Albums chart, but several singles—"Where's da Party At?", "Freaks", "Hands in the Air", and "I-ight"—made it to the Hot Rap Singles chart. Luther Campbell appears on the album.

Critical reception

The Colorado Springs Gazette-Telegraph considered the album to be "reminiscent of a time when house parties took place in basements, with blue lights in the sockets and where a hundred bodies danced in harmony to Sugarhill Gang tunes." The Indianapolis Star noted that "scratches, drum machines and keyboards spit out dancehall reggae, but it seems Fresh hasn't spent any time developing rhythms or raps."

Track listing
"Where’s da Party At?" – 4:25  
"It’s On" – 4:07  
"Take ’Em Uptown" – 4:38  
"I-Ight" – 4:45  
"The Original Old School!" – 5:39  
"Freaks" – 3:08  
"Freak It Out!" – 6:34  
"It’s Really Goin’ on in Here" – 6:51  
"Who’s Got All the Money?" – 3:55  
"Get da Money" – 5:56  
"Hands in the Air" – 4:11  
"Doug E. Got It Goin’ On" – 5:08  
"Keep It Going" – 3:28  
"Breath of Fresh Air" – 4:31

Charts

References

1995 albums
Albums produced by Easy Mo Bee
Doug E. Fresh albums
Gee Street Records albums